Joe Thomas "Tommy" Lodge (born 16 April 1921, Skelmanthorpe, Huddersfield, Yorkshire, England - July 2012) is an English first-class cricketer, who played two matches for Yorkshire County Cricket Club in 1948.

Lodge also played for the Yorkshire Second XI in 1947 and 1948. He took part in three century opening partnerships with Jakeman, Halliday and J.C. Rigg.  He also performed well in the Huddersfield and Bradford Leagues, and was renowned as a cricket coach, acting as professional with Perthshire C.C. for at least ten seasons, scoring over 1,000 runs in each season up to 1961. He also coached at Strathallen School, Scotland, and played as a defender for Huddersfield Town & St Johnstone.

He made his first-class cricket debut against Kent at Bradford Park Avenue in June, opening the batting and scoring 30 and 5 as Yorkshire won by six wickets.  His last match came in July against Northamptonshire, Lodge scored 13 runs batting at number three, as Yorkshire won by an innings and 196 runs.  A right arm medium pacer, he bowled eight overs for 17 runs without success.

References
Joe Lodge's profile at Cricinfo.com

External links
Cricinfo Profile

1921 births
2012 deaths
Yorkshire cricketers
Cricketers from Huddersfield
English cricketers
English cricketers of 1946 to 1968
People from Skelmanthorpe
English footballers
Association football defenders
English Football League players
Scottish Football League players
Huddersfield Town A.F.C. players
St Johnstone F.C. players
Sportspeople from Yorkshire